The Barnum Museum of Natural History was a natural history museum on the grounds of Tufts University in Medford, Massachusetts. The museum was established by P.T. Barnum and displayed valuable exotic dead animals from his circus. His greatest prize was Jumbo the Elephant whose taxidermied hide was displayed. The building now known as Barnum Hall was gutted when a fire destroyed the entire collection inside on April 14, 1975. The building has since been partially reconstructed.

History
The museum was conceived as part of President Capen's campaign to expand the university. Barnum, who was a lifelong Universalist supporter for which Tufts was affiliated, was targeted for the campaign. In May 1883, Capen persuaded Barnum to give the money under the agreement that the transaction be kept under secrecy and that once his identity be disclosed the building would 'forever be called the Barnum Museum of Natural History.' The building was built to accompany his museum in Bridgeport, Connecticut. The building was designed by architect J. Phillip Rinn from the firm Andrews, Jones, Biscoe & Whitmore. The original building stood two stories above a basement with a laboratory and lecture room. The ground floor included a library and a vestibule. The upper floors contained a grand hall, 34 feet high, intended for the display of the specimens. Rinn designed the building in cohesion with the Goddard Chapel to give the campus a sense of homogeneity.

The museum incorporated specimens which Tufts professor John Marshall had amassed during the previous decades, mostly rocks and minerals. Additionally, Mary Goddard, one of Tufts' earliest benefactors provided the museum with an array of coins, ethnological material, and stuffed birds. For Barnum, the museum was one of the first of many natural history collections which he provided to over 200 American universities.

After Barnum's death in 1891, the museum continued to prosper. A further $40,000 provided by Barnum gave the museum two new wings and several new collections. The university constructed the west wing in 1894 and added a new biological laboratory, classrooms, and library. An east wing was built in 1935 for labs and offices. The third addition, the Dana Laboratory, was built in 1963. At a cost of $750,000 it was built using funds from the National Science Foundation. The addition was designed by Perry Shaw, Hepburn and Dean and was named for Charles Dana.

Conflagration
On April 14, 1975, faulty wiring in a refrigeration unit on the second floor of the building ignited a fire. By 4:30 a.m. the building and its contents were engulfed in the flames. Firefighters from eight towns were enlisted to battle the blaze and by 6 a.m. the fire was put out. Despite the size of the fire, there were no deaths. The remains of the building continued to smolder but when the smoke cleared after several days all that was left of the specimens were ashes and the metal armatures which held the remains upright. The morning after the fire, an employee entered the remains and swept Jumbo's remains into an empty 14-ounce Peter Pan peanut butter jar. The loss of Jumbo became international news which overshadowed the loss of invaluable research done by the Biology department.

Aftermath

Today Jumbo's ashes are housed in a makeshift urn and are brought to inspire the university athletic teams. Other remains of his hide including the tail survived and are stored in the archives of the university. The plan to rebuild Barnum Hall started immediately and under President Jean Mayer the university improved the maintenance of other buildings to prevent future fires. The firm of Kubitz and Pepi was commissioned for the reconstruction, however the original mansard roof was replaced by a flat roof. In the end the complete interior gutting and roof replacement after the fire caused a substantial loss of architectural integrity. In 1976, Barnum Hall reopened to students. The lack of Tufts' mascot prompted students to place a papier-mâché statue that once stood at Benson's Wild Animal Farm in New Hampshire. In 2013, a university committee decided to improve the situation by commissioning Steven Whyte to create a bronze statue of Jumbo. The 5,000 pound statue was paid for by a former interim vice president of operations at Tufts. On April 27, 2015, the bronze statue was unveiled.

Gallery

References

Buildings at Tufts University
Natural history museums in Massachusetts
University museums in Massachusetts
Building and structure fires in the United States
P. T. Barnum